April Mullen is a Canadian actress and filmmaker.

Career 
In 2012, Mullen became the first woman to direct a live action, fully stereoscopic 3D feature film, Dead Before Dawn (2012). In 2015, she directed the neo-noir grindhouse feature film 88 (2015).

Mullen was sought out for comment when the study, Women in View on Screen, concluded Canadian women mostly get to sit in the director's chair on small film and television projects, while men get the big-budget projects.

Mullen has also commented on the perspective that women bring to filmmaking behind the lens: "Women have this vulnerability and connection to a depth of emotions that I can see and feel in certain moments of truth in the films we create. To me, the female gaze is transparency – the veil between audience and filmmaker is thin, and that allows people in more." She is also sought out for her perspective on the "female gaze" in movies.

In 2016, Mullen directed Below Her Mouth in 2016, which was an official selection at the 2016 Toronto International Film Festival. She was one of several honorees of the Birks Diamond Tribute celebrating Canadian women in film during the 2016 festival. The Globe and Mail profiled her "female gaze" on the film. Following the 2016 festival, she signed with Verve.

In 2017, Mullen directed the action feature film Badsville. In 2020, she directed the thriller feature film Wander.

Upcoming projects 
Her next project as a director is the sci-fi film Simulant.

Personal life 
She grew up in Niagara Falls, Ontario, and now lives in Los Angeles.

Accolades 
Mullen was added to the Niagara Falls Arts and Culture Wall of Fame in 2016.

Filmography

See also
 List of female film and television directors
 List of LGBT-related films directed by women

References

External links
 
 
 

Canadian film actresses
Canadian women film directors
Living people
Year of birth missing (living people)
People from Niagara Falls, Ontario
Canadian television actresses
Film directors from Ontario
Actresses from Ontario